Gangsters of the Frontier (also known as Raiders of the Frontier in the United Kingdom) is a 1944 American Western film written and directed by Elmer Clifton. The film stars Dave O'Brien, Tex Ritter and Guy Wilkerson, with Patti McCarty, Harry Harvey and Betty Miles. The film was released on 22 September 1944, by Producers Releasing Corporation.

The fifteenth of the Texas Rangers film series, the film is regarded as a metaphor for World War II as a fascist-type gang enslaves a town.

This film was the first of the "Texas Rangers" series to feature Tex Ritter, who replaced James Newill after 14 movies.

In the film, Tex Ritter sings "Please Remember Me" by Ritter and Robert McGimsey, and "He's Gone Up the Trail" and "Ride, Ranger, Ride" by Tim Spencer.

Plot

Cast
 Tex Ritter as Tex Haines
 Dave O'Brien as Texas Ranger Dave Wyatt
 Guy Wilkerson as Panhandle Perkins
 Patti McCarty as Jane Deering
 Harry Harvey as Mayor Frank Merritt
 Betty Miles as Mrs. Frank Merritt
 I. Stanford Jolley as Bart Kern
 Marshall Reed as Rad Kern
 Charles King as Henchman
 Clarke Stevens as Henchman Shade

See also
The Texas Rangers series:
 The Rangers Take Over (1942)
 Bad Men of Thunder Gap (1943)
 West of Texas (1943)
 Border Buckaroos (1943)
 Fighting Valley (1943)
 Trail of Terror (1943)
 The Return of the Rangers (1943)
 Boss of Rawhide (1943)
 Outlaw Roundup (1944)
 Guns of the Law (1944)
 The Pinto Bandit (1944)
 Spook Town (1944)
 Brand of the Devil (1944)
 Gunsmoke Mesa (1944)
 Gangsters of the Frontier (1944)
 Dead or Alive (1944)
 The Whispering Skull (1944)
 Marked for Murder (1945)
 Enemy of the Law (1945)
 Three in the Saddle (1945)
 Frontier Fugitives (1945)
 Flaming Bullets (1945)

Notes

External links
 
 
 

1944 films
1940s English-language films
Films directed by Elmer Clifton
American black-and-white films
1944 Western (genre) films
Producers Releasing Corporation films
American Western (genre) films
1940s American films